Together at Christmas is the fourth collaborative studio album by English singers Michael Ball and Alfie Boe. It was released on 20 November 2020 through Decca Records. The album peaked at number one on the UK Albums Chart.

Background
In October 2020, Michael Ball and Alfie Boe announced details of their new album, it will be titled Together At Christmas. The album features festive classics and one brand new original song titled "My Christmas Will Be Better Than Yours". Talking about the album Ball said, "Me and Alfie, together at Christmas, I can't think of anything better! In these strange times, we wanted to create an album of songs that we like to listen to at Christmas, plus a few surprises along the way, including an original song! Hopefully our fans will love listening to this for many years to come. This year it's certainly going to be a Christmas we'll never forget. Can't wait to see you all on tour in 2021." Alfie Boe said, "Keeping the Christmas spirit alive seems more important than ever this year. We wanted to create a festive album that brings joy, love and happiness. Spreading the Christmas cheer is something we all need a little extra of during these challenging times, so however people are going to be able to spend their holiday season, we'll be right here Back Together At Christmas with our fans who we are incredibly grateful for and can't wait to see in person when we're back for a brand new tour in 2021."

Commercial performance
On 23 November 2020, the album was at number one on the Official Chart Update and was over 7,000 chart sales ahead of Be by BTS. On 27 November 2020, the album entered the UK Albums Chart at number one with sales of 32,882 in its first week, 96% of which were physical sales, the album became the duo's third number one together. Talking to the Official Charts Company, the duo said, "We just want to say thank you so much for getting us to Number 1, we really appreciate it. This is all for you – to bring you a bit of cheer this year. We’re sending lots of love, have a very Merry Christmas." Together at Christmas became Michael Ball's eleventh Top ten album in the UK and became Alfie Boe's ninth Top ten album in the UK. As of September 2022, the album had sold 160,388 copies in the UK.

Tour
In October 2020 Michael Ball and Alfie Boe announced that they will go on a UK arena tour in 2021 to support the release of their new album. They are planning to head out on a 13-date arena tour in November 2021, culminating at London's O2 Arena on December 19. Tickets for the shows went on sale on Friday 30 October.

Track listing
All songs produced by Nick Patrick.

Charts

Weekly charts

Year-end charts

Certifications

Release history

References

2020 albums
Alfie Boe albums
Decca Records albums
Michael Ball albums
Vocal duet albums